Darren Elkins (born May 16, 1984) is an American mixed martial artist signed to the Ultimate Fighting Championship where he fights in the Featherweight division. Elkins is known for his toughness and comeback victories.

Background
Elkins was born in Hobart, Indiana and competed four years in wrestling for Portage High School. Elkins placed seventh in the state of Indiana as a freshman, qualified for the state competition as a sophomore, placed third as a junior, and was a State Champion as a high school senior. Darren also won multiple freestyle state championships as a youth. Elkins then went to college for two years and wrestled at University of Wisconsin Parkside, but did not finish his education at the university nor earn a degree.

Mixed martial arts career

Ultimate Fighting Championship
Elkins made his UFC debut on the preliminary card of UFC on Versus 1, where he defeated Duane Ludwig via TKO after Ludwig suffered a serious ankle injury after being taken down by Elkins in the first round.

His next bout took place on the preliminary card of UFC on Versus 2 against Charles Oliveira. Elkins took Oliveira down early, but his opponent quickly attempted a triangle choke. Oliveira then transitioned to an armbar, which forced Elkins to submit.

Elkins was expected to face touted prospect Edson Barboza on November 20, 2010, at UFC 123, but Elkins was forced from the card with an injury and replaced by Mike Lullo.

Elkins made his Featherweight debut against world ranked Michihiro Omigawa on June 11, 2011, at UFC 131. He won the fight via unanimous decision.

Elkins won a unanimous decision over Zhang Tiequan on October 8, 2011, at UFC 136. After several failed guillotine attempts from Zhang, Elkins was able to dominate him from top position including at several points mounting him and pounding away with strikes.

Elkins defeated TUF 14 winner Diego Brandão on May 26, 2012, at UFC 146. Elkins utilized his top game with ground and pound to win the second and third rounds, earning him the unanimous decision victory.

Elkins fought fellow featherweight prospect Steven Siler on November 17, 2012, at UFC 154. After dominating the fight for three rounds, Elkins was awarded the unanimous decision victory, moving him to 4–0 at featherweight and 5-1 overall in the UFC.

Elkins faced Antonio Carvalho on March 16, 2013, at UFC 158. Elkins won via first-round TKO stoppage after landing strikes that rocked Carvalho followed by a knockdown, prompting the referee to intervene.

After taking virtually no damage in the fight against Carvalho, Elkins made a quick return and faced Chad Mendes on April 20, 2013, at UFC on Fox 7, replacing an injured Clay Guida. He lost the fight by 1st-round TKO.

Elkins faced Hatsu Hioki on August 28, 2013, at UFC Fight Night 27. After getting hurt by a body kick late in the first round, Elkins rallied in the last two rounds and won the fight via unanimous decision.

Elkins faced Jeremy Stephens on January 25, 2014, at UFC on Fox 10. He lost the fight via unanimous decision.

Elkins was briefly linked to a matchup with Tatsuya Kawajiri on September 20, 2014, at UFC Fight Night 52, but the bout never materialized as Kawajiri was sidelined indefinitely with a detached retina.

Elkins faced Lucas Martins on October 25, 2014, at UFC 179. Elkins won the fight via split decision. The scorecards were 30–27, 30–27, 27–30.

Elkins faced Hacran Dias on December 20, 2014, at UFC Fight Night 58. Fighting in Brazil for his second straight fight, he lost the fight via unanimous decision, 29-28 across the scorecards.

For a third consecutive fight, Elkins appeared on an international card where he faced Robert Whiteford on October 24, 2015, at UFC Fight Night 76. He won the fight via a  dominating 30-27 unanimous decision, almost finishing Whiteford on one occasion.

Elkins next faced Chas Skelly on March 5, 2016, at UFC 196. He won the fight by a dominating unanimous decision, 30–26, 30–27, 29–27.

Elkins faced Godofredo Pepey on July 23, 2016, at UFC on Fox 20. He won the fight via dominating unanimous decision, 30–26, 29–27, 29–27.

Elkins faced Mirsad Bektić on March 4, 2017, at UFC 209. After being dominated the first two and a half rounds, Elkins rallied back in the third round and won by knockout due to punches and a head kick. It is widely considered to be one of the greatest comebacks in UFC history. He was awarded a Performance of the Night bonus.

Elkins faced Dennis Bermudez on July 22, 2017, at UFC on Fox 25. He won the back-and-forth fight via split decision, 29–28, 29–28, 28–29.

Elkins faced Michael Johnson on January 14, 2018, at UFC Fight Night: Stephens vs. Choi. He won the fight via rear-naked choke submission in round two. The trademark "Damage" weathered a first round storm to complete the comeback and was awarded a Performance of the Night bonus.

Elkins faced Alexander Volkanovski on July 14, 2018, at UFC Fight Night 133. He lost the fight via unanimous decision.

Elkins faced Ricardo Lamas on November 17, 2018, at UFC Fight Night 140. He lost the fight via TKO in the third round.

Elkins faced Ryan Hall on July 13, 2019, at UFC on ESPN+ 13. He lost the fight via unanimous decision.

Elkins faced Nate Landwehr on May 16, 2020, at UFC on ESPN: Overeem vs. Harris. He lost the fight via unanimous decision.

Return to winning
Elkins faced Luiz Eduardo Garagorri on November 7, 2020, at UFC on ESPN: Santos vs. Teixeira. He won the fight via a submission in round three.

Elkins faced Darrick Minner on July 24, 2021, at UFC on ESPN: Sandhagen vs. Dillashaw. He won the bout via TKO. This fight earned him the Performance of the Night award.

Elkins faced Cub Swanson on December 18, 2021, at UFC Fight Night: Lewis vs. Daukaus. He lost the bout via TKO in round one.

Elkins faced Tristan Connelly on April 30, 2022 at UFC on ESPN 35. He won the bout via unanimous decision.

Elkins faced Jonathan Pearce on December 3, 2022, at UFC on ESPN 42. He lost the bout via unanimous decision.

Championships and accomplishments
Ultimate Fighting Championship
Performance of the Night (Three times) 
Most fights in the UFC Featherweight division (25)
Most decision wins in the UFC Featherweight division (11)
Most unanimous decision wins in the UFC Featherweight division (9)
Most takedowns landed in the UFC Featherweight division (54)
Most submission attempts in the UFC Featherweight division (22)
MMAJunkie.com
2017 Comeback of the Year vs. Mirsad Bektić

Mixed martial arts record

|-
|Loss
|align=center|27–11
|Jonathan Pearce
|Decision (unanimous)
|UFC on ESPN: Thompson vs. Holland
|
|align=center|3
|align=center|5:00
|Orlando, Florida, United States
|
|-
|Win
|align=center|27–10
|Tristan Connelly
|Decision (unanimous)
|UFC on ESPN: Font vs. Vera 
|
|align=center|3
|align=center|5:00
|Las Vegas, Nevada, United States
|
|-
|Loss
|align=center|26–10
|Cub Swanson
|TKO (spinning wheel kick and punches)
|UFC Fight Night: Lewis vs. Daukaus
|
|align=center|1
|align=center|2:12
|Las Vegas, Nevada, United States
|
|-
|Win
|align=center|26–9
|Darrick Minner
|TKO (punches)
|UFC on ESPN: Sandhagen vs. Dillashaw
|
|align=center|2
|align=center|3:48
|Las Vegas, Nevada, United States
|
|-
|Win
|align=center|25–9
|Luiz Eduardo Garagorri
|Submission (rear-naked choke)
|UFC on ESPN: Santos vs. Teixeira
|
|align=center|3
|align=center|2:22
|Las Vegas, Nevada, United States
|
|-
|Loss
|align=center|24–9
|Nate Landwehr
|Decision (unanimous)
|UFC on ESPN: Overeem vs. Harris
|
|align=center|3
|align=center|5:00
|Jacksonville, Florida, United States
|
|-
|Loss
|align=center|24–8
|Ryan Hall
|Decision (unanimous)
|UFC Fight Night: de Randamie vs. Ladd 
|
|align=center|3
|align=center|5:00
|Sacramento, California, United States
|
|-
|Loss
|align=center|24–7
|Ricardo Lamas
|TKO (elbows and punches)
|UFC Fight Night: Magny vs. Ponzinibbio 
|
|align=center|3
|align=center|4:09
|Buenos Aires, Argentina
| 
|-
|Loss
|align=center|24–6
|Alexander Volkanovski
|Decision (unanimous) 
|UFC Fight Night: dos Santos vs. Ivanov 
|
|align=center|3
|align=center|5:00
|Boise, Idaho, United States
|
|-
|Win
|align=center|24–5
|Michael Johnson
|Submission (rear-naked choke)
|UFC Fight Night: Stephens vs. Choi
|
|align=center|2
|align=center|2:22
|St. Louis, Missouri, United States
|
|-
|Win
|align=center|23–5
|Dennis Bermudez
|Decision (split)
|UFC on Fox: Weidman vs. Gastelum 
|
|align=center|3
|align=center|5:00
|Uniondale, New York, United States
|
|-
|Win
|align=center|22–5
|Mirsad Bektić
|KO (punches)
|UFC 209
|
|align=center|3
|align=center|3:19
|Las Vegas, Nevada, United States
| | 
|-
|Win
|align=center|21–5
|Godofredo Pepey
|Decision (unanimous) 
|UFC on Fox: Holm vs. Shevchenko 
|
|align=center|3
|align=center|5:00
|Chicago, Illinois, United States
|  
|-
|Win
|align=center|20–5
|Chas Skelly
|Decision (unanimous) 
|UFC 196
|
|align=center|3
|align=center|5:00
|Las Vegas, Nevada, United States
|
|-
|Win
|align=center|19–5
|Robert Whiteford
|Decision (unanimous)
|UFC Fight Night: Holohan vs. Smolka
|
|align=center|3
|align=center|5:00
|Dublin, Ireland
|
|- 
|Loss
|align=center|18–5
|Hacran Dias
|Decision (unanimous)
|UFC Fight Night: Machida vs. Dollaway
|
|align=center|3
|align=center|5:00
|Barueri, Brazil
|
|-
|Win
|align=center|18–4
|Lucas Martins
|Decision (split)
|UFC 179
|
|align=center|3
|align=center|5:00
|Rio de Janeiro, Brazil
|
|-
|Loss
|align=center|17–4
|Jeremy Stephens
| Decision (unanimous)
|UFC on Fox: Henderson vs. Thomson
|
|align=center|3
|align=center|5:00
|Chicago, Illinois, United States
|
|-
|Win
|align=center|17–3
|Hatsu Hioki
| Decision (unanimous)
|UFC Fight Night: Condit vs. Kampmann 2
|
|align=center|3
|align=center|5:00
|Indianapolis, Indiana, United States
|
|-
|Loss
|align=center|16–3
|Chad Mendes
|TKO (punches)
|UFC on Fox: Henderson vs. Melendez
|
|align=center|1
|align=center|1:08
|San Jose, California, United States
|
|-
|Win
|align=center|16–2
|Antonio Carvalho
|TKO (punches)
|UFC 158
|
|align=center|1
|align=center|3:06
|Montreal, Quebec, Canada
|
|-
|Win
|align=center|15–2
|Steven Siler
|Decision (unanimous)
|UFC 154
|
|align=center|3
|align=center|5:00
|Montreal, Quebec, Canada
|
|-
|Win
|align=center|14–2
|Diego Brandão
|Decision (unanimous)
|UFC 146
|
|align=center|3
|align=center|5:00
|Las Vegas, Nevada, United States
|
|-
|Win
|align=center|13–2
|Zhang Tiequan
|Decision (unanimous)
|UFC 136
|
|align=center|3
|align=center|5:00
|Houston, Texas, United States
|
|-
|Win
|align=center|12–2
|Michihiro Omigawa
|Decision (unanimous)
|UFC 131
|
|align=center|3
|align=center|5:00
|Vancouver, British Columbia, Canada
|
|-
|Loss
|align=center|11–2
|Charles Oliveira
|Submission (armbar)
|UFC Live: Jones vs. Matyushenko
|
|align=center|1
|align=center|0:41
|San Diego, California, United States
|
|-
|Win
|align=center|11–1
|Duane Ludwig
|TKO (ankle injury)
|UFC Live: Vera vs. Jones
|
|align=center|1
|align=center|0:44
|Broomfield, Colorado, United States
|
|-
|Win
|align=center|10–1
|Gideon Ray
|Decision (unanimous)
|Hoosier FC 1: Raise Up
|
|align=center|3
|align=center|5:00
|Valparaiso, Indiana, United States
|
|-
|Win
|align=center|9–1
|Bryan Neville
|TKO (punches)
|Total Fight Challenge 17
|
|align=center|1
|align=center|1:27
|Hammond, Indiana, United States
|
|-
|Loss
|align=center|8–1
|Ted Worthington
|TKO (doctor stoppage)
|Duneland Classic 6
|
|align=center|1
|align=center|0:13
|Crown Point, Indiana, United States
|
|-
|Win
|align=center|8–0
|Danny Rodriguez
|Submission (rear-naked choke)
|Total Fight Challenge 15
|
|align=center|1
|align=center|1:36
|Hammond, Indiana, United States
|
|-
|Win
|align=center|7–0
|Pat Curran
|Decision (unanimous)
|C3: Domination
|
|align=center|3
|align=center|5:00
|Hammond, Indiana, United States
|
|-
|Win
|align=center|6–0
|Kenny Klein
|TKO (punches)
|C3: Summer Fight Fest 3
|
|align=center|1
|align=center|1:36
|Highland, Indiana, United States
|
|-
|Win
|align=center|5–0
|Decarlo Johnson
|Submission (guillotine choke)
|C3: Corral Combat Classic 2
|
|align=center|2
|align=center|0:24
|Hammond, Indiana, United States
|
|-
|Win
|align=center|4–0
|Atsuhiro Tsuboi
|Submission (Von Flue choke)
|Bodog Fight: Vancouver
|
|align=center|1
|align=center|1:55
|Vancouver, British Columbia, Canada
|
|-
|Win
|align=center|3–0
|Daniel Wanderley
|TKO (corner stoppage)
|IMMAC 2: Attack
|
|align=center|1
|align=center|5:00
|Chicago, Illinois, United States
|
|-
|Win
|align=center|2–0
|Matt Joseph
|TKO (punches)
|Bourbon Street Brawl 3
|
|align=center|1
|align=center|N/A
|Chicago, Illinois, United States
|
|-
|Win
|align=center|1–0
|Jeremy Markam
|TKO (punches)
|Bourbon Street Brawl 2
|
|align=center|1
|align=center|N/A
|Chicago, Illinois, United States
|
|-

See also
 List of current UFC fighters
 List of male mixed martial artists

References

External links

American male mixed martial artists
Mixed martial artists from Indiana
Lightweight mixed martial artists
Featherweight mixed martial artists
Mixed martial artists utilizing collegiate wrestling
Mixed martial artists utilizing Brazilian jiu-jitsu
1984 births
Living people
American practitioners of Brazilian jiu-jitsu
People from Hobart, Indiana
People from Lake County, Indiana
Ultimate Fighting Championship male fighters
American male sport wrestlers
Amateur wrestlers